Legal English is the type of English as used in legal writing. In general, a legal language is a formalized language based on logic rules which differs from the ordinary natural language in vocabulary, morphology, syntax, and semantics, as well as other linguistic features, aimed to achieve consistency, validity, completeness and soundness, while keeping the benefits of a human-like language such as intuitive execution, complete meaning, and open upgrade. However, Legal English has been referred to as a "sublanguage", as Legal English differs from ordinary English. A specialized use of certain terms and linguistic patterns governs the teaching of legal language. Thus, "we study legal language as a kind of second language, a specialized use of vocabulary, phrases, and syntax that helps us to communicate more easily with each other".

The term legalese, on the other hand, is a term associated with a traditional style of legal writing that is part of this specialized discourse of lawyers: communication that "lay readers cannot readily comprehend". This term describes legal writing which may be cluttered, wordy, indirect, and may include unnecessary technical words or phrases. Historically, legalese is language a lawyer might use in drafting a contract or a pleading but would not use in ordinary conversation. For this reason, the traditional style of legal writing has been labeled reader-unfriendly. Proponents of plain English/plain language argue that legal "writing style should not vary from task to task or audience to audience...; whatever lawyers write must be Clear, Correct, Concise, and Complete". These four Cs describe "characteristics of good legal writing style" in the United States.

There are different kinds (genres) of legal writing: for example, academic legal writing as in law journals, juridical legal writing as in court judgments, or legislative legal writing as in laws, regulations, contracts, and treaties. Another variety is the language used by lawyers to communicate with clients requiring a more "reader-friendly" style of written communication than that used with law professionals.

For lawyers operating internationally, communicating with clients and other professionals across cultures requires a need for transnational legal awareness and transcultural linguistic awareness. Whatever the form of legal writing, legal skills and language skills form a vital part of higher education and professional training.

Legal English has particular relevance when applied to legal writing and the drafting of written material, including:
 legal documents: contracts, licences, etc.
 court pleadings: summonses, briefs, judgments, etc.
 laws: acts of parliament and subordinate legislative acts, case reports 
 legal correspondence: cease and desist letters

Legal English has traditionally been the preserve of lawyers from English-speaking countries (especially the U.S., the UK, Ireland, Canada, Australia, New Zealand, Kenya, and South Africa) which have shared common law traditions. However, due to the spread of Legal English as the predominant language of international business, as well as its role as a legal language within the European Union, Legal English is now a global phenomenon. It may informally be referred to as lawspeak.

Historical development
In prehistoric Britain, traditional common law was discussed in the vernacular (see Celtic law). The legal language and legal tradition changed with waves of conquerors over the following centuries. Roman Britain (after the conquest beginning in AD 43) followed Roman legal tradition, and its legal language was Latin. Following the Roman departure from Britain circa 410 and the Anglo-Saxon invasion of Britain, the dominant tradition was instead Anglo-Saxon law, which was discussed in the Germanic vernacular (Old English), and written in Old English since circa 600, beginning with the Law of Æthelberht. Following the Norman invasion of England in 1066, Anglo-Norman French became the official language of legal proceedings in England for a period of nearly 300 years until the Pleading in English Act 1362 (and continued in minor use for another 300 years), while Medieval Latin was used for written records for over 650 years. Some English technical terms were retained, however (see Anglo-Saxon law: Language and dialect for details).

In legal pleadings, Anglo-Norman developed into Law French, from which many words in modern legal English are derived. These include property, estate, chattel, lease, executor, and tenant. The use of Law French during this period had an enduring influence on the general linguistic register of modern legal English. That use also accounts for some of the complex linguistic structures used in legal writing. In 1362, the Statute of Pleading was enacted, which stated that all legal proceedings should be conducted in English (but recorded in Latin). This marked the beginning of formal Legal English; Law French continued to be used in some forms into the 17th century, although Law French became increasingly degenerate.

From 1066, Latin was the language of formal records and statutes, and was replaced by English in the Proceedings in Courts of Justice Act 1730. However, because only the highly-educated were fluent in Latin, it never became the language of legal pleading or debate. The influence of Latin can be seen in a number of words and phrases such as ad hoc, de facto, de jure, bona fide, inter alia, and ultra vires, which remain in current use in legal writing (see Legal Latin).

Style
In 2004, David Crystal proposed a stylistic influence upon English legal language. During the Medieval period, lawyers used a mixture of Latin, French and English. To avoid ambiguity, lawyers often offered pairs of words from different languages. Sometimes there was little ambiguity to resolve and the pairs merely gave greater emphasis, becoming a stylistic habit. This is a feature of legal style that continues to the present day. Examples of mixed language doublets are: "breaking and entering" (English/French), "fit and proper" (English/French), "lands and tenements" (English/French), and "will and testament" (English/Latin). Examples of English-only doublets are "let and hindrance" and "have and hold".

Modern English vocabulary draws significantly from Germanic languages, French, and Latin, the lattermost often by way of French. These vocabularies are used preferentially in different registers, with words of French origin being more formal than those of Germanic origin, and words of Latin origin being more formal than those of French origin. Thus, the extensive use of French and Latin words in Legal English results in a relatively formal style.

Further, legal English is useful for its dramatic effect: for example, a subpoena compelling a witness to appear in court often ends with the archaic threat "Fail not, at your peril"; the "peril" is not described (being arrested and held in contempt of court) but the formality of the language tends to have a stronger effect on the recipient of the subpoena than a simple statement like "We can arrest you if you don't show up".

Whereas legal language in the Medieval period combined Latin, French, and English to avoid ambiguity. According to Walter Probert, judicial lawyers, roughly starting in the twentieth century, often manipulate the language to be more persuasive of their campaign ideals.

Key features

As noted above, legal English differs greatly from standard English in a number of ways. The most important of these differences are as follows:

 Use of terms of art. Legal English, in common with the language used by other trades and professions, employs a great deal of technical terminology which is unfamiliar to the layman (e.g. waiver, restraint of trade, restrictive covenant, promissory estoppel). Much of this vocabulary is derived from French and Latin.
 These terms of art include ordinary words used with special meanings. For example, the familiar term consideration refers, in legal English, to contracts and means an act, forbearance or promise by one party to a contract that constitutes the price for which the promise of the other party is bought (Oxford Dictionary of Law). Other examples are construction, prefer, redemption, furnish, hold, and find.
 Lack of punctuation. One aspect of archaic legal drafting, particularly in conveyances and deeds, is the conspicuous absence of punctuation.  In England, the practice of avoiding punctuation arose from the perception that the meaning of legal documents should be contained only in the words used and that punctuation created ambiguity. Another reason was the concern that punctuation could be added undetectably to a document after it came into effect and so alter its meaning. Therefore, the presence of punctuation could be used to detect any tampering with the original document. Punctuation is more commonly used in modern legal drafting to clarify the meaning of any particular sentence.
 Use of doublets and triplets. The mix of languages used in early legalese led to the tendency in legal English to string together two or three words to convey a single legal concept. Examples are null and void, fit and proper, (due) care and attention, perform and discharge, terms and conditions, controversy or claim, promise, agree and covenant and cease and desist. While originally being done to help all lawyers regardless of the language they spoke (English, French, or Latin), it now often joins words with identical meanings.
 Unusual word order. There is a noticeable difference in the word order used compared to standard English. For example, the provisions for termination hereinafter appearing or will at the cost of the borrower forthwith comply with the same.
 Use of unfamiliar pro-forms. For example, the same, the said, the aforementioned etc. The use of the terms often do not replace the noun but are used as adjectives to modify the noun. For example, the said John Smith.
 Use of pronominal adverbs. Words like hereof, thereof, and whereof (and further derivatives, including -at, -in, -after, -before, -with, -by, -above, -on, -upon) are not often used in standard English. Their use in legal English is primarily to avoid repeating names or phrases, such as the parties hereto instead of the parties to this contract.
 -er, -or, and -ee name endings. Legal English contains some words and titles, such as employer and employee; lessor and lessee, in which the reciprocal and opposite nature of the relationship is indicated by the use of alternative endings.
 Use of phrasal verbs. Phrasal verbs play a large role in legal English and are often used in a quasi-technical sense, such as parties enter into contracts, put down deposits, serve [documents] upon other parties, write off debts, attend at locations, and so on.
 Operation within a specific disciplinary value system delimited by professional, epistemological and pragmatic concerns (use of reasonable, proper, clear, appropriate, etc.).

Education

Because of the prevalence of the English language in international business relations, as well as, its role as a legal language globally, a feeling has existed for a long period in the international legal community that traditional English language training is not sufficient to meet lawyers’ English language requirements. The main reason for this is that such training generally ignores the ways in which English usage may be modified by the particular demands of legal practice – and by the conventions of legal English as a separate branch of English in itself.

As a result, non-native English speaking legal professionals and law students increasingly seek specialist training in legal English, and such training is now provided by law schools, language centres, private firms and podcasts that focus on legal language. The UK TOLES examination was set up to teach legal English to non-native English speakers. The exams focus on the aspects of legal English noted as lacking by lawyers. An annual Global Legal Skills Conference was also established as a forum for professors of Legal English and other skills professionals to exchange information on teaching methods and materials.

See also
 Form book
 International Legal English Certificate
 Legal doublet
 Legal writing
 Nomenclature
 Plain Writing Act of 2010

References

Footnotes

References

 Bain Butler, D. (2013). Strategies for clarity in legal writing. Clarity 70. New York: Aspen Publishers. 
 Bain Butler, D. (2015). Developing international EFL/ESL scholarly writers.
 Bhatia, V. K. (1993). Analyzing genre: Language in professional settings. London: Longman.
 Goddard, C. (2010). “Didactic aspects of legal English: Dynamics of course preparation”, in ESP across cultures, Special issue: Legal English across cultures, eds. M. Gotti & C. Williams, vol. 7, 45-62.
 Oates, L. & Enquist, A. (2009). Just writing: Grammar, punctuation, and style for the legal writer, rev. edn. New York, NY: Aspen Publishers.
 Ramsfield, J. (2005). Culture to culture: A guide to U.S. legal writing. Durham, NC: Carolina Academic Press.
 Tiersma, Peter M. (1999), Legal language. Chicago: University of Chicago Press.
 Wydick, R. (2005b). Plain English for lawyers: Teacher's manual, 5th edn. Durham, NC: Carolina Academic Press.

Further reading
 Howard Darmstadter's Precision's Counterfeit: The Failures of Complex Documents, and Some Suggested Remedies The Business Lawyer (American Bar Association, 2010). 
 David Crystal's The Stories of English (Penguin Books, 2004), Part 7.4.
 Bryan Garner's Dictionary of Modern Legal Usage (Oxford University Press).
 Peter Butt and Richard Castle's Modern Legal Drafting.
 Mark Adler's Clarity for Lawyers (2nd edn, The Law Society, 2006).
 Maria Fraddosio, New ELS: English for Law Students (Naples, Edizioni Giuridiche Simone, 2008).
 Daniel R. White's  The Official Lawyer's Handbook (NY: Plume/Penguin 1991), Chapter 13, pp. 171–176,
 Trials and Tribulations—An Anthology of Appealing Legal Humor, edited by Daniel R. White (NY: Plume/Penguin 1991), p. 241.
 Walter Probert's "Law and Persuasion: The Language-Behavior of Lawyers", University of Pennsylvania Law Review, vol. 108, no. 1, 1959, pp. 35–58.

External links

Strategies for clarity in legal writing, Clarity 70, p. 31
 M Pasternak, C Rico, "Tax Interpretation, Planning, and Avoidance: Some Linguistic Analysis", 23 Akron Tax Journal, 33 (2008).
 The oxford Oxford Handbook of Legal Correspondence (2006) by Rupert Haigh and published by Oxford University Press.
 "English Style Guide" for the European Commission.

 A programming language to generate legal English from code.
 Teaching legal English vocabulary. Ruth Breeze (ESP Today, 2015).

English-language education
Legal communication
English legal terminology
English for specific purposes
Dialects of English